Sino-Tibetan War was a 1930–32 war in East Asia.

Sino-Tibetan wars may also refer to:

Tibetan attack on Songzhou (638)
Battle of Dafei River (670)
Battle of Dartsedo (1701)
Chinese expedition to Tibet (1720)
Chinese expedition to Tibet (1910)
Battle of Chamdo (1950)

See also
Chinese expedition to Tibet (disambiguation)